William Brewster may refer to:

William Brewster (Mayflower passenger) (1560–1644), English official and Mayflower passenger in 1620
William Brewster (ornithologist) (1851–1919), American ornithologist
William Brewster (priest) (died 1465), Canon of Windsor
William E. Brewster (1858–1945), American banker, merchant, and politician from Maine
William N. Brewster (1864–1917), American Protestant Christian missionary to China
William R. Brewster (1828–1869), American Civil War general
Willie Brewster (died 1965), whose murder was the first time in the history of Alabama that a white man was convicted of killing a black man
Bill Brewster (American politician) (1941–2022), American politician
Bill Brewster (Canadian politician) (1924–2014), Canadian politician
Bill Brewster (DJ), disc jockey and author of Last Night a DJ Saved My Life